Oskeladden Rock is a rock lying  south of Pål Rock in the Arkticheskiy Institut Rocks, at the northwest extremity of the Wohlthat Mountains of Queen Maud Land. It was discovered and photographed by the German Antarctic Expedition, 1938–39; mapped and named by the Norwegian Antarctic Expedition, 1956–60 from air photos and surveys.

References

Rock formations of Queen Maud Land
Princess Astrid Coast